Dragon Run State Forest is a Virginia state forest located in King and Queen County.   in size, it protects the Dragon Run Swamp while allowing for forest management.  Hunting is permitted on the forest grounds.

References
Virginia state forests

Virginia state forests
Protected areas of King and Queen County, Virginia
2007 establishments in Virginia
Protected areas established in 2007